Jason Rusch is a superhero in the DC Comics Universe, and the second character known as Firestorm. He first appeared in Firestorm (vol. 3) #1 (July 2004), and was created by Dan Jolley and ChrisCross.

Publication history
Another Firestorm series began in 2004 with a new character in the role of Firestorm, Jason Rusch, after Ronnie Raymond was killed in the pages of Identity Crisis, although Rusch's book was cancelled after 30 issues and the Ronnie Raymond Firestorm was resurrected in the pages of Blackest Night.

Yet another Firestorm title was launched in 2011. Starring both Ronnie and his successor Jason, it was one of The New 52 titles launched in the wake of DC's Flashpoint crossover event. The series, The Fury of Firestorm the Nuclear Men, was initially written by Gail Simone and Ethan Van Sciver and drawn by Yıldıray Çınar. Joe Harris replaced Simone starting in issue #7, while co-writer Van Sciver also provided the art for issues #7 and 8 before Çınar returned. Veteran writer/artist Dan Jurgens took over the series with issue #13 in 2012, until the series' end with issue #20 in 2013.

Fictional character biography
In 2004, DC revived the Firestorm comic for the second time, with writer Dan Jolley and artist Chris Cross, but instead of the original Firestorm, Ronnie Raymond, there was a new protagonist; the teenager Jason Rusch.

Jason was a 17-year-old living in Detroit, who wanted nothing more than to escape his home city. He lived with his father Alvin Rusch who had turned abusive after he lost his hand in an industrial accident. His mother left the family sometime after the accident. With the loss of a job he needed for college tuition, Jason turned to a local thug for money, accepting a job as a courier. It was on that job that he encountered the Firestorm Matrix, searching for a new host after Raymond's death. In the aftermath, Jason struggled to cope with his new identity and powers – a struggle that led to the death of the man who had hired him.

Eventually, Jason managed to develop a degree of control over his powers. Ronnie returned within the Firestorm matrix in Firestorm (vol. 2) #9, remaining with Jason as part of Firestorm until he appeared to dissipate in Firestorm (vol. 2) #13.

Shortly after Jason's 18th birthday, a few weeks after Raymond's dissipation, Jason was kidnapped by the new Secret Society of Super Villains for use as a power source in a hidden complex. Freed when the new Secret Six launched a raid on the complex, Jason discovered two important things: he had a fellow prisoner, a mysterious girl named Gehenna, and his imprisonment by the Society had significantly depowered him (Firestorm (vol. 2) #17).

Together, Jason and Gehenna escaped the complex. Gehenna disappeared in the aftermath, but telepathically promised Firestorm that she'd see him again. In Firestorm #19, Donna Troy recruited Firestorm – this time comprising Jason and his best friend Mick Wong – for her outer space team to fight the oncoming instability from Infinite Crisis.

Infinite Crisis
In the 2006 miniseries Infinite Crisis, it was revealed that Martin Stein, alive in space as the "Elemental Firestorm", had sensed the presence of Jason within the Firestorm Matrix, but was unaware of Ronnie's final demise. When Jason, as Firestorm, was gravely wounded in the line of duty, Stein linked with him in a variation of the merge, promising Jason a new Firestorm body to let him return into battle (although Martin had been unable to save Mick) and asking about Ronnie's fate.

Accepting Martin's proposal, Jason asked Stein to become the permanent second member of the Firestorm matrix. Sensing his "errors" (including Mick's death) were the result of his youth and lack of experience, he sought the experience and maturity of Stein. Stein refused at first, but later accepted Jason's request, thus ensuring both a new Firestorm body and the reconstruction of human bodies for both Rusch and Stein.

It was revealed in Infinite Crisis that if the Multiverse had survived up to the present, Jason would have been a native of Earth-Eight.

52
In the 2006–2007 weekly series 52, it is revealed that Firestorm was fused with Cyborg due to malfunctioning Zeta Beam technology. Unmerged after several weeks, Jason, as Firestorm, tried to reform and lead a new Justice League, along with Firehawk, Ambush Bug, Super-Chief, and the Bulleteer. After a failure in handling a time-displacement crisis staged by Skeets, the new League was disbanded in disgrace, adding strain to the already shaky friendship with Lorraine, as Jason still holds her and the rest of Donna's Space Team responsible for Mick's death. Finally, during the World War III event versus Black Adam, Jason settled all differences with Lorraine, rekindling their friendship and asking for her powers, necessary to activate Firestorm after the mysterious disappearance of Stein.

"One Year Later"
As the storyline jumped ahead one year (and the series itself was now re-titled as Firestorm the Nuclear Man from issue #23 on), Professor Stein has mysteriously vanished, and Rusch has been merging with Firehawk to become Firestorm, allowing him to use her powers as well. The two decided to look for Stein together. Stein had been kidnapped and tortured by the Pupil, a former teaching assistant of Stein's. Flanked by the D.O.L.L.I.s, a group of cyborg soldiers of limited cognitive ability, the Pupil (formerly known as Adrian Burroughs) questioned the nearly dead Stein about the secrets of the universe. Jason and Lorraine, along with the mysterious teleport-er Gehenna, freed the captured Stein and restored him to full health. Jason is a college freshman at New York City's Columbus University and seems to have ties with Dani Sharpe, a member of the senior staff at LexCorp.

The Firestorm team of Jason and Firehawk made several appearances across the DCU before the search for Martin ended. This included dealing with the latest OMAC and teaming up with Superman in the "Back in Action" story arc in Action Comics. Firehawk later introduced Jason to Pozhar, a Russian superhero who was once a part of the Firestorm Matrix; together, the trio take on a newly reborn Tokamak. This series ended with Firestorm the Nuclear Man #35 (April 2007).

Anti-Life Equation

Jason and Stein meet Shilo Norman, and are attacked in succession by members of the New Gods, such as Orion of New Genesis, Granny Goodness's Female Furies and a greatly augmented Kalibak of Apokolips. Shilo informs Stein and Rusch that one-quarter of the Life Equation is hidden within the Firestorm Matrix. The others are held by Earth's other three Elementals (possibly the Red Tornado, Naiad, and the Swamp Thing). Darkseid fears that the Life Equation might challenge the Anti-Life Equation. Orion wished to keep Professor Stein safe, and Darkseid's elite wished to secure the Firestorm Matrix for Darkseid. The Lord of Evil descended upon them, ripped the professor from Rusch within the Firestorm Matrix, then vanished without a trace. Jason, with Gehenna as a "hidden partner" in their fusion, began his search for the missing Stein.

Justice League
While apprehending Killer Frost in the commission of a heist, Jason is severely wounded by Lex Luthor, the Joker, and the Cheetah. While still recovering, he goes to aid the Justice League's captive members. Upon freeing the members of the League, he joins the battle against the Injustice League. After this victory, Firestorm is drafted into the League by Batman.

During the team's encounter with the planet-destroying villain the Starbreaker and the black-ops team the Shadow Cabinet, Jason eventually faces Carl Sands ( the Shadow Thief), the villain who killed Ronnie and inadvertently caused Jason's transformation into Firestorm. Sands mocks Jason for being an unworthy successor and nearly kills him just like his predecessor, but Jason rejects the villain's insinuation that he is inferior and emerges victorious. Jason instead uses his abilities to seal Sands's mouth shut with duct tape, preventing the utilization of the shadows within his body, thus rendering the villain powerless. He later assists Icon and the rest of the Justice League in the final battle with the Starbreaker.

After this, Jason plays a minor role in the miniseries Justice League: Cry for Justice. A short time later, Firestorm is seen helping search for survivors alongside Animal Man and Starfire after Star City is destroyed by Prometheus.

Blackest Night
In the 2009–2010 Blackest Night miniseries, Ronnie's reanimated corpse is called by a black power ring to join the Black Lantern Corps and is shown confronting Barry Allen and Hal Jordan alongside Hawkman, Hawkgirl, the Elongated Man, Sue Dibny, and J'onn J'onzz. Ronnie then attacks Jason (the current Firestorm), and absorbs him into his own version of the Firestorm Matrix. Ronnie, using Jason's unique abilities, turns Gehenna into table salt, simultaneously ripping Gehenna's heart out with a smile. Ronnie's uses the Firestorm Matrix to absorb Jason's anger over Gehenna's death, providing the Black Lanterns with even more emotional energies. Ronnie goes on to attack Barry and co. at the Justice League satellite, but Jason then briefly asserts himself which allows the heroes to escape. Ronnie regains control and proceeds to absorb Jason's willpower. Like other Black Lanterns, the undead Firestorm mimics Ronnie's personality of wisecracking and exhibiting other stereotypical teenage behavior. In the final battle against Nekron, Ronnie is restored to life alongside Jason, and the two are separated as Firestorm. Ronnie is confused, asking the Atom where Stein is while Jason is upset with Ronnie killing Gehenna. Ronnie, however, apparently has no memory of doing so.

Brightest Day

In the 2010–2011 Brightest Day miniseries, Ronnie, still clad in casual clothing from a wild party the night before, arrives at Jason's apartment with Professor Stein and Ray Palmer to attend Gehenna's funeral. Stein and Palmer discuss Ronnie's return and how he no longer remembers anything since death at the Shadow Thief's hands. While the two talk about the paperwork needed to have Ronnie's legal status as "dead" reversed, Ronnie approaches Jason and offers an apology about Gehenna's murder. Jason refuses to accept it, telling Ronnie that he was forced into being an accomplice to his own girlfriend's death, and that Ronnie probably does not even remember her name. When Ronnie is actually unable to remember Gehenna's name, Jason angrily lashes out and punches Ronnie in the face. This causes the two young men to merge into Firestorm, and they begin arguing inside the Firestorm Matrix while Palmer transforms into the Atom in order to help them separate.

Palmer manages to separate Jason and Ronnie, but not before the Firestorm Matrix causes a huge explosion, transmutating everything in the Professor's laboratory into table salt. While recovering in the hospital, Stein explains to Ronnie that it seems to be very dangerous to fuse into Firestorm again. Also, it is revealed that Ronnie, after quickly leaving the hospital and being threatened by Alvin to stay away from Jason, lied to everyone about perfectly remembering murdering Gehenna as a Black Lantern.

Some time after the forceful separation, Ronnie lies sleeping in preparation of a party, when a previously heard voice prods into being awake – a monstrous construct of Gehenna, made totally of table salt, which proceeds to throttle and choke Ronnie, taunting to remember Gehenna; while being interrupted before killing Ronnie, Ronnie is left covered in table salt. Not too long after, Ronnie is lying, recovering from a massive binge, when Jason again forces the merge to help several construction workers endangered when the girders at the site are transmuted without warning into bubble gum. This time, they again hear the mysterious voice taunting them, and Ronnie accepts he remembers killing Gehenna, and they realize something else is lurking from within the Firestorm Matrix.

As Firestorm, Ronnie and Jason visit Stein in an attempt to find out what is happening to them. Stein reveals to them that the Black Lantern Firestorm still exists in the Firestorm Matrix. Firestorm is then told by the Entity that they must learn from each other and defeat the Black Lantern Firestorm before the latter destroys the Entity. Somehow, Jason and Ronnie trade places.

After running a test, Stein reveals the origin of the Firestorm Matrix. Stein believes that during the initial experiment he was able to capture the spark that preceded the Big Bang that created our universe, thereby making the Firestorm Matrix a trigger for a new Big Bang. If the boys continue to experience emotional imbalance, they increase the likelihood of triggering a new Big Bang. After explaining this to the boys, the voice inside them speaks again. Declaring that it is not the Firestorm Matrix, a pair of black hands reaches out from inside Firestorm. Forcibly separating Jason and Ronnie, the Black Lantern Firestorm stands between them, separate from both Ronnie and Jason and apparently calling itself Deathstorm.

Deathstorm reveals its plan to Stein, stating that it intends to create enough emotional instability between Ronnie and Jason that the Firestorm Matrix will trigger another Big Bang, thereby destroying all life in the universe. In order to help accomplish this goal, Deathstorm absorbs Stein's mind in order to use knowledge of Ronnie against him; then, to torture Jason, Deathstorm brings his father Alvin to the lab to absorb as well. Taking flight, Deathstorm beckons Ronnie and Jason (now merged into Firestorm) to follow it. Deathstorm leads them to Silver City, New Mexico and the resting place of the Central Power White Lantern Battery. Deathstorm tries to lift the battery, but is unable to until he infects it with black energy, after which he is able to lift it with ease. After he threatens to destroy the White Lantern Battery and therefore prevent Ronnie and Jason from truly living, a voice beckons him not to. The voice commands him to bring the Central Power White Lantern Battery to the voice as well as an army, at which point Deathstorm brings back the Black Lantern spectrums of Professor Zoom (the Reverse-Flash), Maxwell Lord, Hawk, Jade, Captain Boomerang, Martian Manhunter, Aquaman, Hawkman, Hawkgirl, Deadman and Osiris.

Deathstorm and the Black Lanterns teleport to an unknown location, while Firestorm (Jason and Ronnie) ultimately seek the help from the Justice League. Firestorm arrives at the Hall of Justice asking for help. Firestorm is placed in a containment chamber while the League search for a way to stabilize the energy. However, an internal argument between Ronnie and Jason ignites the spark, apparently resulting in the destruction of the universe. Ronnie and Jason quickly notice, after defeating a hive of Shadow Demons, that the universe was not destroyed as they thought, but they were actually transported to the Anti-Matter Universe. There, they are contacted by the Entity, who reveals to them that since Boston Brand has not yet found the one who will take the Entity's place, it is Firestorm's mission to protect the Entity. Meanwhile, Deathstorm and the Black Lanterns are shown on Qward delivering the White Lantern Battery to someone. That someone is revealed to be the Anti-Monitor, seeking to harvest the life energy within the Lantern to grow stronger. Firestorm takes the White Lantern Battery and attempts to fight the Anti-Monitor, but is defeated. Deathstorm then brings Professor Stein out of his own Matrix to taunt the two with. Deathstorm then attempts to turn Jason and Ronnie into table salt, but the Professor takes the brunt of the attack. Jason and Ronnie decides to truly work together to avenge the Professor. The Entity then declares that Ronnie has accomplished his mission, returning him to life in a burst of white energy that obliterates the Black Lanterns, returns Jason's father to his home, and deposits Firestorm in the Star City forest. Ronnie angrily attempts to make the Entity resurrect the Professor, but is refused. Deadman then arrives, demanding that he be given the White Lantern Battery.

When the "Dark Avatar" made his presence known, Firestorm is part of the Elementals. Ronnie was then transformed by the Entity to become the element of fire and protect the Star City Forest from the "Dark Avatar", which appears to be the Black Lantern version of the Swamp Thing. The Elementals are then fused with the body of Alec Holland in order for him to be transformed by the Entity into the new Swamp Thing and battle against the Dark Avatar. After the Dark Avatar is defeated, the Swamp Thing brought Firestorm back to normal. Afterward, Ronnie and Jason must find a way to contain their Firestorm matrix from the explosion in less than 90 days.

The New 52
After the events of the 2011 Flashpoint storyline, The New 52 reality altered Firestorm's personal history to the point of being completely restarted. Ronnie Raymond is now introduced as a high school senior and the captain of the football team. During a terrorist attack on their school, classmate Jason Rusch produces a vial given to him by Professor Stein, which contains the "God Particle", one of Stein's creations. The God Particle transforms both Jason and Ronnie into Firestorm, and the two teens briefly battle each other before accidentally merging into a hulking creature known as the Fury.

Sharing the identity of Firestorm, with Ronnie being the brawn and Jason being the brains, Firestorm is considered for recruitment into the Justice League along with several other heroes. They play a large part in the events leading up to the Trinity War, the three-way battle between the Justice League (the original team headed by Superman, Batman and Wonder Woman), the Justice League of America (the A.R.G.U.S.-sponsored team led by Steve Trevor, the Green Arrow and Amanda Waller), and Justice League Dark (the paranormal team consisting of John Constantine, Zatanna and the Phantom Stranger). When Superman is framed for the death of Dr. Light and the League is taken into custody, Amanda Waller has Firestorm experiment on their ability to create certain elements: specifically, the mass production of kryptonite. It turns out that the two are indeed capable of using their powers to create it, but with some difficulty. However, this ultimately becomes moot once the Trinity War leads to the invasion of the Crime Syndicate, who supposedly kill the Justice League. In fact, the League is trapped inside Firestorm by his Earth-3 counterpart Deathstorm (a combination of Martin Stein and a corpse the latter experimented upon), with only Batman and Catwoman escaping the initial fracas. The Leagues are presumed dead for a time, but are eventually freed from captivity after the Syndicate is defeated by Batman and Lex Luthor's Injustice League, Batman using Wonder Woman's Lasso of Truth to draw her and the others out of Firestorm.

DC Rebirth
In the Watchmen sequel Doomsday Clock, Firestorm becomes a subject of controversy after claims arise stating that he was created by the American government. Firestorm profanely denounces the "Superman Theory" and insults his Russian counterpart Pozhar, much to the dismay of Martin Stein. Firestorm subsequently becomes embroiled in a fight with several Russian superheroes before appearing to inadvertently turn a crowd of civilian protesters into glass (a feat previously deemed beyond his capabilities). Firestorm flees with the body of an affected child and is found in hiding at the Chernobyl Nuclear Power Plant in Ukraine by Superman. With Superman's encouragement, Firestorm returns the child to normal. Firestorm and Superman return to the affected crowd and are engaged by the Russian military. The area then becomes engulfed in an explosion of blue light.

Powers and abilities

Other versions

Flashpoint
In the alternative timeline of Flashpoint, Jason Rusch is killed by Heat Wave in an attempt to take his place in the Firestorm Matrix, alongside Ronnie Raymond, but is defeated by Cyborg.

In other media

Television
 Jason Rusch / Firestorm appears in Batman: The Brave and the Bold, voiced by Tyler James Williams. This version is an intelligent high school student who was fused with his coach Ronnie Raymond after they were accidentally exposed to Doctor Double X's supercharged nuclear energy. Producer James Tucker said, "...the smart kid has the body and he's got this dumb guy in his head telling him stuff...it's kind of a total flip of the original Firestorm".
 Jason Rusch appears in The Flash episode "Revenge of the Rogues", portrayed by Luc Roderique. This version was one of several scientists who worked on Professor Martin Stein's F.I.R.E.S.T.O.R.M. matrix. After the U.S. army took over the project following Stein's disappearance and S.T.A.R. Labs' particle accelerator explosion, Rusch found work with Mercury Labs.

Film
 Jason Rusch / Firestorm appears in Justice League: Crisis on Two Earths, voiced by Cedric Yarbrough.
 Jason Rusch / Firestorm appears in Lego DC Comics Super Heroes: The Flash, voiced by Phil LaMarr.

Video games
 The Jason Rusch incarnation of Firestorm appears in Injustice 2, voiced by Ogie Banks. This version fuses with Martin Stein, with both being allies of Batman who help restore order to Earth after the fall of Superman's Regime. In their arcade ending, Firestorm tries to defeat Brainiac by overheating his Skull Ship's engines, but the ship explodes and destroys the collected worlds within. Though they know their allies will never look at them the same way again after their mistake, they still pledge to help Batman if needed.
 The Jason Rusch incarnation of Firestorm appears as a playable character in Lego DC Super-Villains. This version fuses with Martin Stein.

References

External links
 

African-American superheroes
Articles about multiple fictional characters
Characters created by Al Milgrom
Characters created by Gerry Conway
Comics characters introduced in 1978
Comics by John Ostrander
DC Comics characters who can move at superhuman speeds
DC Comics characters with accelerated healing
DC Comics characters with superhuman senses
DC Comics characters with superhuman strength
DC Comics male superheroes
DC Comics metahumans
DC Comics scientists
DC Comics television characters
Fictional characters who can turn intangible
Fictional characters with eidetic memory
Fictional characters with absorption or parasitic abilities
Fictional characters with density control abilities
Fictional characters with elemental transmutation abilities
Fictional characters with fire or heat abilities
Fictional characters with nuclear or radiation abilities 
Fictional characters with energy-manipulation abilities
Fictional characters with superhuman durability or invulnerability
Fictional characters with X-ray vision
Fictional nuclear physicists
Fighting game characters
Merged fictional characters